Thomas Bruce White Sr. (March 6, 1881 – December 21, 1971) was an American law officer and prison warden. He is known for solving the difficult Osage murder case and later being warden of the Leavenworth prison.

Biography 
White was born on March 6, 1881, in Oak Hill, Texas, the son of the Travis County, Texas sheriff Robert Emmet White and Margaret White who died when Thomas  was six. He attended Southwestern University in Georgetown, Texas.

Leaving school early, Tom traveled the country holding various jobs in Oklahoma and California. He enlisted in the Texas Rangers from 1905 to 1909 with three of his four siblings. White resigned from the Rangers and worked as a special agent for the Santa Fe Railway and the Southern Pacific Railroad until 1917 and later as an FBI agent until 1926. During that time he was in charge of the Houston office and was being made head of the Osage murder investigation where he and his team solved the difficult case.

After the Osage investigation he left the Bureau and took charge as Warden of the Leavenworth prison up until 1931 when he was seriously injured after being held hostage by armed prisoners and shot in a prison escape attempt.

Afterwards, the Federal Bureau of Prisons decided he should be given a less demanding assignment and transferred him to La Tuna Federal Correctional Institution, near El Paso, Texas. After his retirement from the penitentiary system, White served on a three-man board for Texas Pardons and Parole.

He was in retirement until his death on December 21, 1971.

In popular media
White is portrayed by actor Jesse Plemons in the 2023 film Killers of the Flower Moon.

References 

American prison wardens
1881 births
1971 deaths